Shrove Tuesday or Pancake Day is the day before Ash Wednesday (the first day of Lent), observed in many Christian countries through participating in confession and absolution, the ritual burning of the previous year's Holy Week palms, finalizing one's Lenten sacrifice, as well as eating pancakes and other sweets.

Shrove Tuesday is observed by many Christians, including Anglicans, Lutherans, Methodists and Roman Catholics, who "make a special point of self-examination, of considering what wrongs they need to repent, and what amendments of life or areas of spiritual growth they especially need to ask God's help in dealing with." This moveable feast is determined by Easter. The expression "Shrove Tuesday" comes from the word shrive, meaning "absolve". 

As this is the last day of the Christian liturgical season historically known as Shrovetide, before the penitential season of Lent, related popular practices, such as indulging in food that one might give up as their Lenten sacrifice for the upcoming forty days, are associated with Shrove Tuesday celebrations. The term Mardi Gras is French for "Fat Tuesday", referring to the practice of the last night of eating richer, fatty foods before the ritual fasting of the Lenten season, which begins on Ash Wednesday. Many Christian congregations thus observe the day through eating pancakes or, more specifically, the holding of pancake breakfasts, as well as the ringing of church bells to remind people to repent of their sins before the start of Lent. On Shrove Tuesday, churches also burn the palms distributed during the previous year's Palm Sunday liturgies to make the ashes used during the services held on the very next day, Ash Wednesday.

In some Christian countries, especially those where the day is called Mardi Gras or a translation thereof, it is a carnival day, the last day of "fat eating" or "gorging" before the fasting period of Lent.

History
The tradition of marking the start of Lent has been documented for centuries. Ælfric of Eynsham's "Ecclesiastical Institutes" from around 1000 AD states: "In the week immediately before Lent everyone shall go to his confessor and confess his deeds and the confessor shall so shrive him as he then may hear by his deeds what he is to do [in the way of penance]". By the time of the late Middle Ages, the celebration of Shrovetide lasted until the start of Lent. It was traditional in many societies to eat pancakes or other foods made with the butter, eggs and fat or lard that would need to be used up before the beginning of Lent. Similar foods are fasnachts and pączki. The specific custom of British Christians eating pancakes on Shrove Tuesday dates to the 16th century. Along with its emphasis on feasting, another theme of Shrove Tuesday involves Christians repenting of their sins in preparation to begin the season of Lent in the Christian liturgical calendar. In many Christian parish churches, both Protestant and Roman Catholic, a popular Shrove Tuesday tradition is the ringing of the church bells (on this day, the toll is known as the Shriving Bell) "to call the faithful to confession before the solemn season of Lent" and for people to "begin frying their pancakes".

Terminology

The word shrove is a form of the English word shrive, which means to obtain absolution for one's sins by way of Confession and doing penance. Thus Shrove Tuesday was named after the custom of Christians to be "shriven" before the start of Lent.

In the United Kingdom, Ireland and parts of the Commonwealth, Shrove Tuesday is also known as Pancake Day or Pancake Tuesday, as it became a traditional custom to eat pancakes as a meal. In Irish the day is known as Máirt Inide, from the Latin initium (Jejūniī), "beginning of Lent."  Elsewhere, the day has also been called "Mardi Gras", meaning "Fat Tuesday", after the type of celebratory meal that day.

In Germany, the day is known as Fastnachtsdienstag, Faschingsdienstag, Karnevalsdienstag or Veilchendienstag (the last of which translates to violet [the flower] Tuesday). It is celebrated with fancy dress and a partial school holiday. Similarly, in German American areas, such as Pennsylvania Dutch Country, it is known as Fastnacht Day.

In the Netherlands, it is known as "vastenavond", or in Limburgish dialect "vastelaovend", though the word "vastelaovend" usually refers to the entire period of carnival in the Netherlands. In some parts of Switzerland (e.g. Lucerne), the day is called Güdeldienstag or Güdisdienstag (preceded by Güdismontag). According to the Duden dictionary, the term derives from "Güdel", which means a fat belly stuffed full of food.

In Portuguese-, Spanish- and Italian-speaking countries, among others, it is known as Carnival (to use the English spelling). This derives from Medieval Latin carnelevamen ("the putting away of flesh") and thus to another aspect of the Lenten fast, to abstain from eating meat. It is often celebrated with street processions or fancy dress. 

The most famous of these events has become the Brazilian Carnival in Rio de Janeiro. Venetians have long celebrated carnival with a masquerade. The use of the term "carnival" in other contexts derives from this celebration. In Spain, the Carnival Tuesday is named "día de la tortilla" ("omelette day"): an omelette made with some sausage or pork fat is eaten. On the Portuguese island of Madeira, malasadas are eaten on Terça-feira Gorda (Fat Tuesday in English), which is also the last day of the Carnival of Madeira. Malasadas were cooked in order to use up all the lard and sugar in the house, in preparation for Lenten restrictions. This tradition was taken to Hawaii, where Shrove Tuesday is known as Malasada Day, which dates back to the days of the sugar plantations of the 1800s. The resident Catholic Portuguese workers (who came mostly from Madeira and the Azores) used up butter and sugar prior to Lent by making large batches of malasadas.

In Denmark and Norway, the Tuesday before Ash Wednesday is called Fetetirsdag ("Fat Tuesday"); the prior weekend is known as Fastelavn and is marked by eating fastelavnsboller. Fastelavn is the name for Carnival in Denmark, held either on the Sunday or Monday before Ash Wednesday. Fastelavn developed from the Roman Catholic tradition of celebrating in the days before Lent, but, after Denmark became a Protestant nation, the holiday became less specifically religious. This holiday occurs seven weeks before Easter Sunday, with children dressing up in costumes and gathering treats for the Fastelavn feast. The holiday is generally considered to be a time for children's fun and family games. In Estonia, the day is similarly called Vastlapäev and is generally celebrated by eating pea soup and whipped-cream or whipped-cream and jam-filled sweet-buns called vastlakukkel, similar to the Swedish fastlagsbulle or semla. Children also typically go sledding on this day.

In Iceland, the day is known as Sprengidagur (Bursting Day) and is marked by eating salted meat and peas. In Lithuania, the day is called Užgavėnės. People eat pancakes (blynai) and Lithuanian-style doughnuts. In Sweden, the day is called Fettisdagen (Fat Tuesday), and is generally celebrated by eating a type of sweet roll called fastlagsbulle or semla. In Finland, the day is called laskiainen and is generally celebrated by eating green pea soup and a pastry called laskiaispulla (sweet bread filled with whipped cream and jam or almond paste, same as the Swedish semla). The celebration often includes downhill sledging. 

In Poland, a related celebration falls on the Thursday before Ash Wednesday and is called  (Fat Thursday). It may be held on Shrove Tuesday or in the days immediately preceding it.

In Slovenia, Kurentovanje is also the biggest and best known carnival. There are several more local carnivals usually referred to as Laufarija. In Hungary, and the Hungarian-speaking territories, it is called  (literally the Tuesday leaving the meat) and is celebrated by fancy dress and visiting neighbours.

Traditions
Shrove Tuesday serves a dual purpose of allowing Christians to repent of any sins they might have made before the start of Lent on the next day Ash Wednesday and giving them the opportunity to engage in a last round of merriment before the start of the somber Lenten season, which is characterized by making a Lenten sacrifice, fasting, praying and engaging in various spiritual disciplines, such as marking a Lenten calendar, fasting, abstaining from luxuries, and reading a daily devotional. 

Pancakes are associated with Shrove Tuesday, the day preceding Lent, because they are a way to use up rich foods such as eggs, milk, and sugar, before the fasting season of the 40 days of Lent. The liturgical fasting emphasizes eating simpler food, and refraining from food that would give undue pleasure: in many cultures, this means no meat, lacticinia (dairy products) or eggs.

In Newfoundland and Cape Breton Island, small tokens are frequently cooked in the pancakes. Children take delight in discovering the objects, which are intended to be divinatory. For example, the person who receives a coin will be wealthy; a nail indicates that they will become or marry a carpenter.

Observances

On the final day of the Shrovetide season, Shrove Tuesday, many traditional Christians, such as Anglicans, Lutherans, Methodists and Roman Catholics, "make a special point of self-examination, of considering what wrongs they need to repent, and what amendments of life or areas of spiritual growth they especially need to ask God's help in dealing with." As such, many churches offer confession and absolution on Shrove Tuesday.

On Shrove Tuesday, many Christians finalize their decision with respect to what Lenten sacrifices they will make for Lent. While making a Lenten sacrifice, it is customary to pray for strength to keep it; many often wish others for doing so as well, e.g. "May God bless your Lenten sacrifice."

During Shrovetide, many churches place a basket in the narthex to collect the previous year's Holy Week palm branches that were blessed and distributed during the Palm Sunday liturgies; on Shrove Tuesday, churches burn these palms to make the ashes used during the services held on the very next day, Ash Wednesday.

Festivities

In the United Kingdom, as part of community celebration, many towns held traditional Shrove Tuesday "mob football" games, some dating as far back as the 17th century. The practice mostly died out in the 19th century after the passing of the Highway Act 1835 which banned playing football on public highways. A number of towns have maintained the tradition, including Alnwick in Northumberland (Scoring the Hales), Ashbourne in Derbyshire (called the Royal Shrovetide Football), Atherstone in Warwickshire (called simply the Atherstone Ball Game), St Columb Major in Cornwall (called Hurling the Silver Ball), and Sedgefield in County Durham (Sedgefield Ball Game).

Shrove Tuesday was once known as a "half-holiday" in Britain. It started at 11:00 am with the ringing of a church bell. On Pancake Day, "pancake races" are held in villages and towns across the United Kingdom. The tradition is said to have originated in 1445 when a housewife from Olney, Buckinghamshire, was so busy making pancakes that she forgot the time until she heard the church bells ringing for the service. She raced out of the house to church while still carrying her frying pan and pancake, tossing it to prevent it from burning. The pancake race remains a relatively common festive tradition in the UK, especially England. Participants with frying pans race through the streets tossing pancakes into the air and catching them in the pan while running. The pancake race at Olney traditionally has women contestants who carry a frying pan and race over a 415-yard course to the finishing line. The rules are strict: contestants must toss the pancake at the start and the finish, and wear a scarf and apron.

Since 1950, the people of Liberal, Kansas, and Olney have held the "International Pancake Day" race between the two towns. The two towns' competitors race along an agreed-upon measured course. The times of the two towns' competitors are compared to determine a winner overall. As of 2021, Liberal leads the competition with 38 wins to Olney's 31. A similar race is held in North Somercotes in Lincolnshire, England.

In London, the Rehab Parliamentary Pancake Race takes place every Shrove Tuesday, with teams from the British lower house (the House of Commons), the upper house (the House of Lords), and the Fourth Estate, contending for the title of Parliamentary Pancake Race Champions. The fun relay race is to raise awareness of Rehab, which provides a range of health and social care, training, education, and employment services in the UK for disabled people and others who are marginalised.

Scarborough celebrates by closing the foreshore to all traffic, closing schools early, and inviting all to skip. Traditionally, long ropes were used from the nearby harbour. The town crier rang the pancake bell, situated on the corner of Westborough (main street) and Huntriss Row. Since 1996 a replica "pancake bell" situated at Newborough and North Street has been rung to initiate the day's festivities.

The children of the hamlet of Whitechapel, Lancashire keep alive a local tradition by visiting local households and asking "please a pancake", to be rewarded with oranges or sweets. It is thought the tradition arose when farm workers visited the wealthier farm and manor owners to ask for pancakes or pancake fillings.

Shrove Tuesday in England often involved a form of ritual begging, not dissimilar to wassailing, in which children and adolescents would go door-to-door asking for tidbits from the frying pan. If the household was not forthcoming, they could expect levels of mischief, including the pelting of their house, knock and run, or gate stealing. This was known as Lent Crocking, Nicky-Nan Night, the Drawing of Cloam, Dappy-Door Night, or Pan Sharding.

In Ireland, the observance of fasting at Lent continued up to the 20th century, with Shrove Tuesday ("Tuesday of the initium") marking the last day of the consumption of meat for the Lenten period. This was later relaxed, but with three days of fasting observed, Ash Wednesday, Spy Wednesday, and Good Friday. It was a tradition that the eldest unmarried daughter would toss the first pancake. If the pancake fell on the floor, she would remain unmarried for the next 12 months. As marriages were not traditionally permitted during the Lenten period, as decreed by the Council of Trent, weddings on Shrove Tuesday were popular. In some parts of Ireland the holly from Christmas was saved and burnt in the fire for the pancakes. The night was also known as "Skellig Night" in Counties Cork and Kerry, during the celebrations, those who were unmarried were taunted with jeers and singing.

In Fennoscandia, in particular in Finland and Sweden, as well as Estonia, the day is associated with the semla, a type of almond paste-filled sweet roll.

The day is known as Laskiainen in Finland and Vastlapäev in Estonia. It is a celebration of Balto-Finnic origins, which includes both pagan and ecclesiastic traditions, and is often described as a "mid-winter sliding festival".

Thin pancakes called blini are traditional in Christian festivals in Belarus, Ukraine and Russia also at this time of year (Maslenitsa).

Dates

Shrove Tuesday is exactly 47 days before Easter Sunday, a moveable feast based on the cycles of the moon. The date can be between 3 February and 9 March inclusive.

Shrove Tuesday occurs on these dates:

  –

See also

 Clean Monday
 Collop Monday
 Fat Thursday
 Laskiainen
 Mardi Gras
 Mardi Gras in Mobile, Alabama – United States French-Catholic festival.
 Mardi Gras in New Orleans
 Maslenitsa
 Nickanan Night
 Nuremberg Shrovetide Carnival
 Powder Day
 Shrove Monday
 Tsiknopempti
 Shrove Tuesday: The Legend of Pancake Marion

References

External links
 Worldwide Pancake Recipes: A collection of recipes from different countries

Tuesday observances
British culture
Carnivals
Irish culture
Mardi Gras
Pennsylvania Dutch culture
February observances
March observances
Observances about food and drink
Slavic carnival